Arragonia kautzi is a moth of the family Autostichidae. It is found in Spain.

The wingspan is 15–16 mm. The ground colour of the forewings is ochreous yellow with bluish-grey scales. The hindwings are shining greyish yellow.

References

Moths described in 1928
Holcopogoninae